This is a list of voz news  journalists.

D
 Vanessa Dalzon – Balistrad
 Frantz Duval – Le Nouvelliste

J
 Ady Jean-Gardy – Haitian Press Federation

M
 Michèle Montas – UN Radio

P
 Fincy Pierre – Balistrad
 Liliane Pierre-Paul – Radio Kiskeya
 Emmelie Prophète – Le Nouvelliste

V
 Gary Victor – Le Matin

 
Haitian